Kinsale AFC is a soccer club situated in the town of Kinsale, near the historic site of Charles Fort and within approximately 18 miles from Cork City, Ireland. They play in the Munster Senior League Senior Second 2nd Division, the fifth tier on the Irish football pyramid.

Grounds 

Following discussions with the local council in 1985, the club obtained facilities in Charles Fort in Kinsale. The club now has two pitches. The grounds were renamed Madden Park after the Honorary President, Mr. Paddy Madden.

Club background 

As well as the successful men's team that compete in the Munster Senior League, there is also a junior programme, founded in 1998, which has 300 participants in U7, U8, U9, U10, U11, U13, U14, U15, and U16 categories. Originally playing in the West Cork League, the underage boys are now part of the Cork Schoolboys League. The girls teams play in the Cork Women's and Schoolgirls Soccer League.

Recent success 
Some Kinsale players have represented Cork Athletic Union League in the Oscar Traynor Inter-League Cup. These include;
Derek McCarthy
Stephen O'Donovan
Pat O'Regan
Michael Bradfield
Derek Varian

All of whom received winners medals with in 2009. Additionally, in the same year,  Derek Varian and Derek McCarthy represented the Ireland national team at Junior level.

Honours
Cork Athletic Union League
Winners: 2002–03, 2003–04, 2004–05, 2005–06, 2009–10, 2010–11: 6 
Runners-up: 2006–07, 2008–09: 2
•Cork Schoolboys league

U12 division 2 runners up (2015-2016)

References

External links 
Official Website

Munster Senior League (association football) clubs
Association football clubs in County Cork
Association football clubs established in 1935
1935 establishments in Ireland
Sport in Kinsale
Former Cork Athletic Union League clubs